David Edward Thomas (born 12 January 1955) is a British Labour Party politician and former Member of the European Parliament (MEP). 

He was educated at Cefn Hengoed Comprehensive School, Swansea, and at the University of East Anglia where he took a BA in English. In 2010 he went back to the University of East Anglia to take a Graduate Diploma in Law. He served as the MEP for Suffolk and South West Norfolk from 1994 to 1999.

References

1955 births
Living people
Alumni of the University of East Anglia
Labour Party (UK) MEPs
MEPs for England 1994–1999